Solfeggietto (H 220, Wq. 117: 2) is a short solo keyboard piece in C minor composed in 1766 by Carl Philipp Emanuel Bach. Owens refers to the work as a toccata.

Qualities 

The work is unusual for a keyboard piece in that the main theme and some other passages are fully monophonic, i.e. only one note is played at a time. The piece is commonly assigned to piano students and appears in many anthologies; pedagogically it fosters the playing of an even sixteenth note rhythm by alternating hands.

This piece is easily Bach's best-known, to the point that Paul Corneilson's introduction to The Essential C.P.E. Bach is subtitled "Beyond the Solfeggio in C Minor". Owens also describes it as C. P. E. Bach's most famous work.

The work is often performed by left-hand alone.

Performances 

The piece appears in Breaking Bad, in the third episode of the fifth season, played by Skinny Pete (Charles Baker)

The Canadian pianist Marc-André Hamelin has arranged the piece with additional voices as Solfeggietto a cinque for player piano.

Jazz pianist Bud Powell plays the Solfeggietto in full before improvising on it in "Bud on Bach."

Peter Tork plays it on an electric piano in "33&1/3 Revolutions Per Monkee", a television special, starring the Monkees, which aired on NBC on April 14, 1969.

Notes

Sources

External links 

 
 , Phillip Sear

compositions by Carl Philipp Emanuel Bach
compositions in C minor
compositions for solo piano